The 2022 Texas Rangers season was the 62nd of the Texas Rangers franchise overall, their 51st in Arlington as the Rangers, and the 3rd season at Globe Life Field. As the club's 51st season in Arlington, the 2022 season also marked the 50th anniversary of the team's first season as the Texas Rangers in 1972.

On December 2, 2021, Commissioner of Baseball Rob Manfred announced a lockout of players, following expiration of the collective bargaining agreement (CBA) between the league and the Major League Baseball Players Association (MLBPA). On March 10, 2022, the MLB and MLBPA agreed to a new collective bargaining agreement, thus ending the lockout. Opening Day was played on April 7. Although MLB previously announced that several series would be cancelled due to the lockout, the agreement provides for a 162-game season, with originally canceled games to be made up via doubleheaders.

The Rangers became the first team in history to be strikeout victims of two immaculate innings pitched in the same game on June 15, by Luis García and Phil Maton of the Houston Astros. It was also the first occasion in major league history two immaculate innings were pitched on the same date. On July 31, Reid Detmers of the Los Angeles Angels hurled another immaculate inning against the Rangers, joining the 1979 San Francisco Giants as the only teams to have three while batting.

On August 15, 2022, the Rangers fired manager Chris Woodward after a 51–63 record through 114 games. Tony Beasley was named interim manager for the remainder of the season. On September 14, the Rangers set a new club record for losses by one-run with 32 (with only 13 wins by one run). 

On August 17, 2022, the Rangers fired President of Baseball Operations Jon Daniels. Chris Young, who was named general manager in 2020 to take over the role from Daniels, was named the new club president.

Although the Rangers missed the postseason for the 6th consecutive season, they did improve on their record from the previous season by finishing 68–94 and 4th in the AL West.

Offseason

Lockout 

The expiration of the league's collective bargaining agreement (CBA) with the Major League Baseball Players Association occurred on December 1, 2021, with no new agreement in place. As a result, the team owners voted unanimously to lockout the players stopping all free agency and trades.

The parties came to an agreement on a new CBA on March 10, 2022.

Rule changes 
Pursuant to the new CBA, several new rules were instituted for the 2022 season. The National League will adopt the designated hitter full-time, a draft lottery will be implemented, the postseason will expand from ten teams to twelve, and advertising patches will appear on player uniforms and helmets for the first time.

Regular season

Summary 
On June 15, the Rangers were victim of two immaculate innings delivered by the Houston Astros, the first such feat by one team—and the first time two were delivered on the same date—in major league history.  Starting pitcher Luis García hurled one in the second inning to strike out Nathaniel Lowe, Ezequiel Durán, and Brad Miller.  Five innings later, reliever Phil Maton struck out the same trio of batters for the second immaculate inning.

The Rangers fell victim to another immaculate inning on July 31, by Los Angeles Angels rookie starter Reid Detmers.  In the fourth inning, he struck out Durán, Kole Calhoun and Charlie Culberson.  Durán became the first major league hitter to strike out in three immaculate innings in the same season.  Also, the Rangers joined the 1979 San Francisco Giants as the only major league teams to strike out through three immaculate innings while batting.

American League West

American League Wild Card

Game Log

|- style="background:#fbb;"
| 1 || April 8 || @ Blue Jays || 8–10 || Cimber (1–0) || Santana (0–1) || Romano (1) || Rogers Centre || 45,022 || 0–1 || L1
|- style="background:#fbb;"
| 2 || April 9 || @ Blue Jays || 3–4 || Richards (1–0) || Martin (0–1) || Romano (2) || Rogers Centre || 43,486 || 0–2 || L2
|- style="background:#bfb;"
| 3 || April 10 || @ Blue Jays || 12–6 || Burke (1–0) || Merryweather (0–1) || — || Rogers Centre || 31,549 || 1–2 || W1
|- style="background:#fbb;" 
| 4 || April 11 || Rockies || 4–6  || Bard (1–0) || Holland (0–1) || Goudeau (1) || Globe Life Field || 35,052 || 1–3 || L1
|- style="background:#fbb;" 
| 5 || April 12 || Rockies || 1–4 || Chacín (1–0) || Pérez (0–1) || Bard (1) || Globe Life Field || 15,862 || 1–4 || L2
|- style="background:#bfb;"
| 6 || April 14 || Angels || 10–5 || King (1–0) || Ohtani (0–2) || — || Globe Life Field || 21,440 || 2–4 || W1
|- style="background:#fbb;" 
| 7 || April 15 || Angels || 6–9 || Warren (1–0) || Allard (0–1) || Iglesias (2) || Globe Life Field || 28,723 || 2–5 || L1
|- style="background:#fbb;"
| 8 || April 16 || Angels || 2–7 || Syndergaard (2–0) || Hearn (0–1) || — || Globe Life Field || 34,493 || 2–6 || L2
|- style="background:#fbb;" 
| 9 || April 17 || Angels || 3–8 || Mayers (1–0) || Pérez (0–2) || — || Globe Life Field || 22,650 || 2–7 || L3
|- style="background:#fbb;" 
| 10 || April 19 || @ Mariners || 2–6 || Ray (2–1) || Gray (0–1) || — || T-Mobile Park || 11,067 || 2–8 || L4
|- style="background:#fbb;" 
| 11 || April 20 || @ Mariners || 2–4 || Gilbert (2–0) || Dunning (0–1) || — || T-Mobile Park || 9,374 || 2–9 || L5
|- style="background:#bfb;" 
| 12 || April 21 || @ Mariners || 8–6 || Barlow (1–0) || Steckenrider (0–1) || — || T-Mobile Park || 12,570 || 3–9 || W1
|- style="background:#bfb;" 
| 13 || April 22 || @ Athletics || 8–1 || Otto (1–0) || Oller (0–2) || — || Oakland Coliseum || 7,012 || 4–9 || W2
|- style="background:#bfb;" 
| 14 || April 23 || @ Athletics || 2–0 || Burke (2–0) || Montas (2–2) || Bush (1) || Oakland Coliseum || 9,120 || 5–9 || W3
|- style="background:#fbb;" 
| 15 || April 24 || @ Athletics || 0–2 || Irvin (2–1) || Howard (0–1) || Jiménez (3) || Oakland Coliseum || 11,083 || 5–10 || L1
|- style="background:#bfb;" 
| 16 || April 25 || Astros || 6–2 || Moore (1–0) || Maton (0–1) || — || Globe Life Field || 17,420 || 6–10 || W1
|- style="background:#fbb;" 
| 17 || April 26 || Astros || 1–5 || Odorizzi (1–2) || Hearn (0–2) || — || Globe Life Field || 16,469 || 6–11 || L1
|- style="background:#fbb;" 
| 18 || April 27 || Astros || 3–4 || Javier (1–0) || Martin (0–2) || Stanek (1) || Globe Life Field || 20,399 || 6–12 || L2
|- style="background:#fbb;" 
| 19 || April 28 || Astros || 2–3 || Verlander (2–1) || Bush (0–1) || Montero (1) || Globe Life Field || 19,484 || 6–13 || L3
|- style="background:#fbb;"
| 20 || April 29 || Braves || 3–6 || Anderson (2–1) || Richards (0–1) || Jansen (6) || Globe Life Field || 25,829 || 6–14 || L4
|- style="background:#bfb;"
| 21 || April 30 || Braves || 3–1 || Dunning (1–1) || Elder (1–3) || Barlow (1) || Globe Life Field || 36,097 || 7–14 || W1
|-

|- style="background:#bfb;"
| 22 || May 1 || Braves || 7–3 || Hearn (1–2) || Muller (0–1) || — || Globe Life Field || 38,316 || 8–14 || W2
|- style="background:#bfb;" 
| 23 || May 3 || @ Phillies || 6–4 || Burke (3–0) || Suárez (2–1) || Barlow (2) || Citizens Bank Park || 27,788 || 9–14 || W3
|- style="background:#bfb;" 
| 24 || May 4 || @ Phillies || 2–1  || Bush (1–1) || Hand (1–1) || Barlow (3) || Citizens Bank Park || 21,315 || 10–14 || W4
|- style="background:#fbb;"
| 25 || May 8 || @ Yankees || 1–2 || Holmes (3–0) || King (1–1) || — || Yankee Stadium ||  || 10–15 || L1
|- style="background:#bfb;"
| 26 || May 8 || @ Yankees || 4–2 || Richards (1–1) || King (2–1) || Barlow (4) || Yankee Stadium || 40,714 || 11–15 || W1
|- style="background:#fbb;" 
| 27 || May 9 || @ Yankees || 0–1 || Holmes (4–0) || Martin (0–3) || Chapman (7) || Yankee Stadium || 34,866 || 11–16 || L1
|- style="background:#bfb;"
| 28 || May 10 || Royals || 6–4 || Pérez (1–2) || Keller (1–3) || Barlow (5) || Globe Life Field || 15,407 || 12–16 || W1
|- style="background:#fbb;"
| 29 || May 11 || Royals || 2–8 || Payamps (1–0) || Allard (0–2) || — || Globe Life Field || 15,561 || 12–17 || L1
|- style="background:#bfb;"
| 30 || May 12 || Royals || 3–1 || Hearn (2–2) || Heasley (0–1) || Barlow (6) || Globe Life Field || 14,994 || 13–17 || W1
|- style="background:#fbb;" 
| 31 || May 13 || Red Sox || 1–7 || Pivetta (1–4) || Dunning (1–2) || — || Globe Life Field || 28,324 || 13–18 || L1
|- style="background:#fbb;" 
| 32 || May 14 || Red Sox || 3–11 || Hill (1–1) || Otto (1–1) || — || Globe Life Field || 34,462 || 13–19 || L2
|- style="background:#bfb;" 
| 33 || May 15 || Red Sox || 7–1 || Pérez (2–2) || Brasier (0–2) || — || Globe Life Field || 27,607 || 14–19 || W1
|- style="background:#bfb;" 
| 34 || May 16 || Angels || 7–4 || Gray (1–1) || Syndergaard (3–2) || Barlow (7) || Globe Life Field || 15,110 || 15–19 || W2
|- style="background:#bfb;" 
| 35 || May 17 || Angels || 10–5 || Santana (1–1) || Tepera (1–1) || — || Globe Life Field || 17,727 || 16–19 || W3
|- style="background:#bfb;"
| 36 || May 18 || Angels || 6–5  || Santana (2–1) || Iglesias (1–2) || — || Globe Life Field || 20,366 || 17–19 || W4
|- style="background:#fbb;"
| 37 || May 19 || @ Astros || 1–5 || Valdez (3–2) || Otto (1–2) || — || Minute Maid Park || 34,593 || 17–20 || L1
|- style="background:#bfb;"
| 38 || May 20 || @ Astros || 3–0 || Pérez (3–2) || Javier (2–2) || — || Minute Maid Park || 35,294 || 18–20 || W1
|- style="background:#fbb;"
| 39 || May 21 || @ Astros || 1–2 || Verlander (6–1) || Gray (1–2) || Pressly (5) || Minute Maid Park || 37,187 || 18–21 || L1
|- style="background:#fbb;"
| 40 || May 22 || @ Astros || 2–5 || Urquidy (4–1) || Hearn (2–3) || Pressly (6) || Minute Maid Park || 38,745 || 18–22 || L2
|- style="background:#fbb;"
| 41 || May 24 || @ Angels || 3–5 || Syndergaard (4–2) || Dunning (1–3) || Iglesias (11) || Angel Stadium || 23,791 || 18–23 || L3
|- style="background:#bfb;"
| 42 || May 25 || @ Angels || 7–2 || Otto (2–2) || Detmers (2–2) || — || Angel Stadium || 22,950 || 19–23 || W1
|- style="background:#bfb;" 
| 43 || May 26 || @ Athletics || 4–1 || Bush (2–1) || Trivino (1–3) || Barlow (8) || Oakland Coliseum || 3,203 || 20–23 || W2
|- style="background:#bfb;" 
| 44 || May 27 || @ Athletics || 8–5 || Moore (2–0) || Jiménez (1–2) || Santana (1) || Oakland Coliseum || 5,010 || 21–23 || W3
|- style="background:#bfb;" 
| 45 || May 28 || @ Athletics || 11–4 || Hearn (3–3) || Logue (2–4) || — || Oakland Coliseum || 6,502 || 22–23 || W4
|- style="background:#fbb;" 
| 46 || May 29 || @ Athletics || 5–6 || Jiménez (2–2) || Martin (0–4) || — || Oakland Coliseum || 8,342 || 22–24 || L1
|- style="background:#bfb;"
| 47 || May 30 || Rays || 9–5 || Otto (3–2) || Rasmussen (5–2) || — || Globe Life Field || 25,605 || 23–24 || W1
|- style="background:#bfb;"
| 48 || May 31 || Rays || 3–0 || Pérez (4–2) || Yarbrough (0–2) || Barlow (9) || Globe Life Field || 16,317 || 24–24 || W2
|-

|- style="background:#fbb;"
| 49 || June 1 || Rays || 3–4  || Poche (1–0) || Santana (2–2) || Wisler (1) || Globe Life Field || 20,634 || 24–25 || L1
|- style="background:#fbb;"
| 50 || June 2 || Rays || 1–3 || Kluber (2–2) || Hearn (3–4) || Thompson (3) || Globe Life Field || 17,097 || 24–26 || L2
|- style="background:#fbb;"
| 51 || June 3 || Mariners || 3–4 || Murfee (1–0) || Barlow (1–1) || Sewald (3) || Globe Life Field || 25,378 || 24–27 || L3
|- style="background:#bfb;"
| 52 || June 4 || Mariners || 3–2 || Otto (4–2) || Gonzales (3–6) || Barlow (10) || Globe Life Field || 28,794 || 25–27 || W1
|- style="background:#fbb;"
| 53 || June 5 || Mariners || 5–6  || Castillo (3–0) || Burke (3–1) || Sewald (4) || Globe Life Field || 27,427 || 25–28 || L1
|- style="background:#bbb;" 
| — || June 6 || @ Guardians || colspan=8| Postponed (rain); Makeup June 7
|- style="background:#fbb;"
| 54 || June 7  || @ Guardians || 3–6 || Quantrill (3–3) || Gray (1–3) || Clase (10) || Progressive Field ||  || 25–29 || L2
|- style="background:#bfb;"
| 55 || June 7  || @ Guardians || 6–3 || Hearn (4–4) || McCarty (0–1) || Barlow (11) || Progressive Field || 10,763 || 26–29 || W1
|- style="background:#fbb;"
| 56 || June 8 || @ Guardians || 0–4 || Morgan (2–1) || Dunning (1–4) || — || Progressive Field || 10,965 || 26–30 || L1
|- style="background:#fbb;" 
| 57 || June 10 || @ White Sox || 3–8 || Graveman (2–1) || King (1–2) || — || Guaranteed Rate Field || 24,270 || 26–31 || L2
|- style="background:#bfb;"
| 58 || June 11 || @ White Sox || 11–9  || Moore (3–0) || Foster (1–1) || — || Guaranteed Rate Field || 30,221 || 27–31 || W1
|- style="background:#bfb;" 
| 59 || June 12 || @ White Sox || 8–6  || Barlow (2–1) || Foster (1–2) || Allard (1) || Guaranteed Rate Field || 31,096 || 28–31 || W2
|- style="background:#bfb;"
| 60 || June 13 || Astros || 5–3 || Burke (4–1) || Neris (1–3) || Moore (1) || Globe Life Field || 29,805 || 29–31 || W3
|- style="background:#fbb;"
| 61 || June 14 || Astros || 3–4 || Abreu (4–0) || King (1–3) || Pressly (12) || Globe Life Field || 29,370 || 29–32 || L1
|- style="background:#fbb;" 
| 62 || June 15 || Astros || 2–9 || García (4–5) || Miller (0–1) || — || Globe Life Field || 24,992 || 29–33 || L2
|- style="background:#bfb;" 
| 63 || June 16 || @ Tigers || 3–1 || Santana (3–2) || Soto (2–4) || Barlow (12) || Comerica Park || 17,448 || 30–33 || W1
|- style="background:#bfb;" 
| 64 || June 17 || @ Tigers || 7–0 || Gray (2–3) || Skubal (5–4) || — || Comerica Park || 21,996 || 31–33 || W2
|- style="background:#fbb;" 
| 65 || June 18 || @ Tigers || 7–14 || García (1–2) || Hearn (4–5) || — || Comerica Park || 28,179 || 31–34 || L1
|- style="background:#fbb;" 
| 66 || June 19 || @ Tigers || 3–7 || Lange (4–1) || Dunning (1–5 || — || Comerica Park || 25,919|| 31–35 || L2
|- style="background:#bfb;"
| 67 || June 21 || Phillies || 7–0 || Pérez (5–2) || Gibson (4–3) || — || Globe Life Field || 29,153 || 32–35 || W1
|- style="background:#bfb;" 
| 68 || June 22 || Phillies || 4–2 || Gray (3–3) || Wheeler (6–4) || Barlow (13) || Globe Life Field || 20,704 || 33–35 || W2
|- style="background:#fbb;" 
| 69 || June 24 || Nationals || 1–2 || Edwards Jr. (1–1) || Santana (3–3) || Rainey (9) || Globe Life Field || 28,854 || 33–36 || L1
|- style="background:#bfb;"
| 70 || June 25 || Nationals || 3–2 || Barlow (3–1) || Finnegan (2–2) || — || Globe Life Field || 36,183 || 34–36 || W1
|- style="background:#fbb;" 
| 71 || June 26 || Nationals || 4–6 || Tetreault (2–1) || Otto (4–3) || Rainey (10) || Globe Life Field || 34,220 || 34–37 || L1
|- style="background:#bfb;" 
| 72 || June 27 || @ Royals || 10–4 || Pérez (6–2) || Bubic (1–5) || — || Kauffman Stadium || 12,876 || 35–37 || W1
|- style="background:#bfb;" 
| 73 || June 28 || @ Royals || 8–3 || Gray (4–3) || Heasley (1–4) || — || Kauffman Stadium || 19,593 || 36–37 || W2
|- style="background:#fbb;" 
| 74 || June 29 || @ Royals || 1–2 || Greinke (2–4) || Dunning (1–6) || Barlow (10) || Kauffman Stadium || 11,391 || 36–38 || L1
|-

|- style="background:#fbb;" 
| 75 || July 1 || @ Mets || 3–4 || Peterson (5–1) || Otto (4–4) || Díaz (17) || Citi Field || 35,639 || 36–39 || L2
|- style="background:#bfb;" 
| 76 || July 2 || @ Mets || 7–3 || Pérez (7–2) || Williams (1–5) || — || Citi Field || 26,494 || 37–39 || W1
|- style="background:#fbb;" 
| 77 || July 3 || @ Mets || 1–4 || Carrasco (9–4) || Gray (4–4) || Díaz (18) || Citi Field || 25,241 || 37–40 || L1
|- style="background:#fbb;" 
| 78 || July 4 || @ Orioles || 6–7  || Baker (3–3) || Moore (3–1) || — || Camden Yards || 18,670 || 37–41 || L2
|- style="background:#fbb;" 
| 79 || July 5 || @ Orioles || 9–10  || Krehbiel (4–3) || Moore (3–2) || — || Camden Yards || 7,371 || 37–42 || L3
|- style="background:#fbb;" 
| 80 || July 6 || @ Orioles || 1–2 || Watkins (2–1) || Otto (4–5) || López (14) || Camden Yards || 7,648 || 37–43 || L4
|- style="background:#bfb;"
| 81 || July 8 || Twins || 6–5 || Gray (5–4) || Gray (4–2) || Martin (1) || Globe Life Field || 30,392 || 38–43 || W1
|- style="background:#bfb;" 
| 82 || July 9 || Twins || 9–7 || Moore (4–2) || Durán (0–3) || Martin (2) || Globe Life Field || 35,427 || 39–43 || W2
|- style="background:#fbb;"
| 83 || July 10 || Twins || 5–6 || Bundy (5–4) || Burke (4–2) || Duffey (2) || Globe Life Field || 24,751 || 39–44 || L1
|- style="background:#bfb;"
| 84 || July 11 || Athletics || 10–8 || Howard (1–0) || Martínez (2–2) || Martin (3) || Globe Life Field || 20,660 || 40–44 || W1
|- style="background:#fbb;"
| 85 || July 12 || Athletics || 7–14  || Snead (1–0) || Santana (3–4) || — || Globe Life Field || 17,485 || 40–45 || L1
|- style="background:#bfb;"
| 86 || July 13 || Athletics || 5–2 || Gray (6–4) || Blackburn (6–5) || Richards (1) || Globe Life Field || 22,394 || 41–45 || W1
|- style="background:#fbb;"
| 87 || July 14 || Mariners || 5–6 || Festa (2–0) || Santana (3–5) || Castillo (6) || Globe Life Field || 19,243 || 41–46 || L1
|- style="background:#fbb;"
| 88 || July 15 || Mariners || 3–8 || Ray (8–6) || Hearn (4–6) || — || Globe Life Field || 26,494 || 41–47 || L2
|- style="background:#fbb;"
| 89 || July 16 || Mariners || 2–3  || Castillo (7–1) || Martin (0–5) || Festa (1) || Globe Life Field || 35,761 || 41–48 || L3
|- style="background:#fbb;" 
| 90 || July 17 || Mariners || 2–6 || Borucki (2–0) || Otto (4–6) || — || Globe Life Field || 26,378 || 41–49 || L4
|- style="text-align:center; background:#bbcaff;"
| colspan="11" | 92nd All-Star Game: Los Angeles, CA
|- style="background:#bfb;"
| 91 || July 21 || @ Marlins || 8–0 || Gray (7–4) || López (6–5) || — || LoanDepot Park || 9,524 || 42–49 || W1
|- style="background:#fbb;"
| 92 || July 22 || @ Athletics || 4–5 || Irvin (5–7) || Howard (1–2) || Puk (1) || Oakland Coliseum || 6,620 || 42–50 || L1
|- style="background:#fbb;"
| 93 || July 23 || @ Athletics || 1–3 || Acevedo (3–2) || Santana (3–6) || Jackson (2) || Oakland Coliseum || 10,190 || 42–51 || L2
|- style="background:#bfb;"
| 94 || July 24 || @ Athletics || 11–8 || Pérez (8–2) || Blackburn (6–6) || — || Oakland Coliseum || 9,835 || 43–51 || W1
|- style="background:#fbb;"
| 95 || July 25 || @ Mariners || 3–4 || Flexen (7–8) || Otto (4–7) || Swanson (2) || T-Mobile Park || 23,581 || 43–52 || L1
|- style="background:#fbb;"
| 96 || July 26 || @ Mariners || 4–5 || Swanson (1–0) || Martin (0–6) || — || T-Mobile Park || 25,837 || 43–53 || L2
|- style="background:#fbb;"
| 97 || July 27 || @ Mariners || 2–4 || Gonzales (6–10) || Gray (7–5) || Festa (2) || T-Mobile Park || 25,509 || 43–54 || L3
|- style="background:#bfb;"
| 98 || July 28 || @ Angels || 2–0 || Howard (2–2) || Ohtani (9–6) || Moore (2) || Angel Stadium || 29,718 || 44–54 || W1
|- style="background:#bfb;"
| 99 || July 29 || @ Angels || 7–2 || Pérez (9–2) || Sandoval (3–7) || — || Angel Stadium || 29,906 || 45–54 || W2
|- style="background:#fbb;"
| 100 || July 30 || @ Angels || 7–9 || Toussaint (1–0) || Martin (0–7) || Iglesias (16) || Angel Stadium || 32,968 || 45–55 || L1
|- style="background:#bfb;"
| 101 || July 31 || @ Angels || 5–2 || Burke (5–2) || Quijada (0–3) || Hernández (1) || Angel Stadium || 29,257 || 46–55 || W1
|-

|- style="background:#fbb;"
| 102 || August 1 || Orioles || 2–7 || Watkins (4–1) || Gray (7–6) || Akin (2) || Globe Life Field || 19,161 || 46–56 || L1
|- style="background:#fbb;"
| 103 || August 2 || Orioles || 2–8 || Lyles (8–8) || Howard (2–3) || — || Globe Life Field || 21,622 || 46–57 || L2
|- style="background:#fbb;"
| 104 || August 3 || Orioles || 3–6 || Pérez (6–1) || Leclerc (0–1) || — || Globe Life Field || 20,221 || 46–58 || L3
|- style="background:#bfb;" 
| 105 || August 4 || White Sox || 3–2 || Burke (6–2) || Cueto (4–5) || Hernández (2) || Globe Life Field || 20,972 || 47–58 || W1
|- style="background:#fbb;"
| 106 || August 5 || White Sox || 1–2 || Cease (12–4) || Otto (4–8) || Hendriks (22) || Globe Life Field || 25,470 || 47–59 || L1
|- style="background:#bfb;"
| 107 || August 6 || White Sox || 8–0 || Dunning (2–6) || Kopech (4–8) || — || Globe Life Field || 38,275 || 48–59 || W1
|- style="background:#fbb;"
| 108 || August 7 || White Sox || 2–8 || Giolito (8–6) || Howard (2–4) || — || Globe Life Field || 29,579 || 48–60 || L1
|- style="background:#fbb;"
| 109 || August 9 || @ Astros || 5–7 || Urquidy (11–4) || Pérez (9–3) || Pressly (22) || Minute Maid Park || 30,629 || 48–61 || L2
|- style="background:#bfb;"
| 110 || August 10 || @ Astros || 8–4  || Hearn (5–6) || Maton (0–2) || — || Minute Maid Park || 26,670 || 49–61 || W1
|- style="background:#fbb;"
| 111 || August 11 || @ Astros || 3–7 || Valdez (11–4) || Ragans (0–1) || — || Minute Maid Park || 30,872 || 49–62 || L1
|- style="background:#fbb;"
| 112 || August 12 || Mariners || 2–6 || Kirby (4–3) || Hearn (5–7) || — || Globe Life Field || 22,622 || 49–63 || L2
|- style="background:#bfb;"
| 113 || August 13 || Mariners || 7–4 || Martin (1–7) || Gonzales (7–12) || Hernández (3) || Globe Life Field || 31,621 || 50–63 || W1
|- style="background:#bfb;"
| 114 || August 14 || Mariners || 5–3 || Sborz (1–0) || Brash (3–4) || Leclerc (1) ||Globe Life Field || 25,560 || 51–63 || W2
|- style="background:#bfb;"
 | 115 || August 15 || Athletics || 2–1 || Otto (5–8) || Kaprielian (3–7) || Hernández (4) || Globe Life Field || 13,141 || 52–63 || W3
|- style="background:#fbb;"
| 116 || August 16 || Athletics || 1–5 || Sears (4–0) || Arihara (0–1) || — || Globe Life Field || 15,260 || 52–64 || L1
|- style="background:#fbb;"
| 117 || August 17 || Athletics || 2–7 || Oller (2–5) || Ragans (0–2) || — || Globe Life Field || 14,846 || 52–65 || L2
|- style="background:#bfb;"
| 118 || August 18 || Athletics || 10–3 || Dunning (3–6) || Logue (3–7) || — || Globe Life Field || 16,495 || 53–65 || W1
|- style="background:#fbb;"
| 119 || August 19 || @ Twins || 1–2 || Bundy (7–5) || Pérez (9–4) || López (22) || Target Field || 22,627 || 53–66 || L1
|- style="background:#bfb;"
| 120 || August 20 || @ Twins || 4–3  || Hernández (1–0) || Thielbar (2–2) || — || Target Field || 21,781 || 54–66 || W1
|- style="background:#bfb;"
| 121 || August 21 || @ Twins || 7–0 || Arihara (1–1) || Ryan (9–6) || Hearn (1) || Target Field || 24,802 || 55–66 || W2
|- style="background:#bfb;" 
| 122 || August 22 || @ Twins || 2–1 || Alexy (1–0) || Gray (7–4) || Moore (3) || Target Field || 18,595 || 56–66 || W3
|- style="background:#fbb;"
| 123 || August 23 || @ Rockies || 6–7 || Lawrence (2–1) || Burke (6–3) || Bard (26) || Coors Field || 28,533 || 56–67 || L1
|- style="background:#bfb;"
| 124 || August 24 || @ Rockies || 16–4 || Pérez (10–4) || Ureña (2–5) || — || Coors Field || 25,213 || 57–67 || W1
|- style="background:#bfb;"
| 125 || August 26 || Tigers || 7–6 || Otto (6–8) || Alexander (3–8) || Leclerc (2) || Globe Life Field || 20,357 || 58–67 || W2
|- style="background:#fbb;"
| 126 || August 27 || Tigers || 2–11 || Rodríguez (3–3) || Keuchel (2–8) || — || Globe Life Field || 34,357 || 58–68 || L1
|- style="background:#fbb;"
| 127 || August 28 || Tigers || 8–9 || Hutchison (2–7) || Arihara (2–1) || Jiménez (2) || Globe Life Field || 24,938 || 58–69 || L2
|- style="background:#fbb;"
| 128 || August 30 || Astros || 2–4 || Valdez (14–4) || Dunning (3–7) || Neris (3) || Globe Life Field || 25,566 || 58–70 || L3
|- style="background:#fbb;" 
| 129 || August 31 || Astros || 3–5 || Javier (8–9) || Pérez (10–5) || Montero (10) || Globe Life Field || 19,607 || 58–71 || L4
|-

|- style="background:#fbb;"
| 130 || September 1 || @ Red Sox || 8–9 || Familia (2–1) || Hernández (1–1) || — || Fenway Park || 31,340 || 58–72 || L5
|- style="background:#fbb;"
| 131 || September 2 || @ Red Sox || 1–9 || Danish (3–1) || Keuchel (2–9) || — || Fenway Park || 31,628 || 58–73 || L6
|- style="background:#fbb;"
| 132 || September 3 || @ Red Sox || 3–5 || Bello (1–4) || Santana (3–7) || Schreiber (6) || Fenway Park || 31,474 || 58–74 || L7
|- style="background:#fbb;"
| 133 || September 4 || @ Red Sox || 2–5 || Ort (1–1) || Dunning (3–8) || Schreiber (7) || Fenway Park || 32,422 || 58–75 || L8
|- style="background:#fbb;"
| 134 || September 5 || @ Astros || 0–1 || Brown (1–0) || Pérez (10–6) || Montero (12) || Minute Maid Park || 35,162 || 58–76 || L9
|- style="background:#bfb;"
| 135 || September 6 || @ Astros || 4–3 || Hearn (6–7) || Valdez (14–5) || Leclerc (3) || Minute Maid Park || 26,803 || 59–76 || W1
|- style="background:#fbb;"
| 136 || September 7 || @ Astros || 3–4  || Neris (5–4) || Hernández (1–2) || — || Minute Maid Park || 26,239 || 59–77 || L1
|- style="background:#fbb;" 
| 137 || September 9 || Blue Jays || 3–4 || Mayza (6–0) || Leclerc (0–2) || Romano (32) || Globe Life Field || 21,329 || 59–78 || L2
|- style="background:#fbb;"
| 138 || September 10 || Blue Jays || 7–11 || Gausman (12–9) || Arihara (1–3) || Mayza (1) || Globe Life Field || 28,340 || 59–79 || L3
|- style="background:#bfb;" 
| 139 || September 11 || Blue Jays || 4–1 || Pérez (11–6) || Richards (3–2) || Leclerc (4) || Globe Life Field || 20,984 || 60–79 || W1
|- style="background:#bfb;"
| 140 || September 12  || @ Marlins || 3–2 || Hernández (2–2) || Okert (5–3) || Leclerc (5) || LoanDepot Park || 5,095 || 61–79 || W2
|- style="background:#fbb;"
| 141 || September 12  || @ Marlins || 6–10 || Hoeing (1–1) || Alexy (1–1) || — || LoanDepot Park || 5,242 || 61–80 || L1
|- style="background:#bfb;" 
| 142 || September 13 || Athletics || 8–7 || Burke (7–3) || Payamps (3–5) || — || Globe Life Field || 14,925 || 62–80 || W1
|- style="background:#fbb;"
| 143 || September 14 || Athletics || 7–8 || Cyr (1–0) || Leclerc (0–3) || Acevedo (1) || Globe Life Field || 25,700 || 62–81 || L1
|- style="background:#bfb;"
| 144 || September 16 || @ Rays || 4–3 || Pérez (12–6) || Kluber (10–9) || Leclerc (6) || Tropicana Field || 14,127 || 63–81 || W1
|- style="background:#fbb;"
| 145 || September 17 || @ Rays || 1–5 || Yarbrough (2–8) || Gray (7–7) || — || Tropicana Field || 14,094 || 63–82 || L1
|- style="background:#fbb;"
| 146 || September 18 || @ Rays || 3–5 || Springs (9–4) || Otto (6–9) || Fairbanks (8) || Tropicana Field || 12,835 || 63–83 || L2
|- style="background:#fbb;"
| 147 || September 20 || Angels || 2–5 || Sandoval (6–9) || Santana (3–8) || Herget (6) || Globe Life Field || 19,472 || 63–84 || L3
|- style="background:#bfb;" 
| 148 || September 21 || Angels || 7–2 || Dunning (4–8) || Davidson (2–7) || — || Globe Life Field || 20,959 || 64–84 || W1
|- style="background:#bfb;" 
| 149 || September 22 || Angels || 5–3 || Moore (5–2) || Quijada (0–5) || Leclerc (7) || Globe Life Field || 16,223 || 65–84 || W2
|- style="background:#fbb;"
| 150 || September 23 || Guardians || 3–6 || Morris (1–2) || Hearn (6–8) || Clase (38) || Globe Life Field || 34,862 || 65–85 || L1
|- style="background:#fbb;"
| 151 || September 24 || Guardians || 2–4 || Quantrill (14–5) || Burke (7–4) || Clase (39) || Globe Life Field || 28,415 || 65–86 || L2
|- style="background:#fbb;"
| 152 || September 25 || Guardians || 4–10 || Civale (3–6) || Ragans (0–3) || — || Globe Life Field || 31,845 || 65–87 || L3
|- style="background:#bfb;"
| 153 || September 27 || @ Mariners || 5–0 || Miller (1–1) || Ray (12–11) || — || T-Mobile Park || 23,221 || 66–87 || W1
|- style="background:#fbb;" 
| 154 || September 28 || @ Mariners || 1–3 || Kirby (8–4) || Pérez (12–7) || Sewald (20) || T-Mobile Park || 21,863 || 66–88 || L1
|- style="background:#fbb;" 
| 155 || September 29 || @ Mariners || 9–10  || Flexen (8–9) || King (1–4) || — || T-Mobile Park || 21,094 || 66–89 || L2
|- style="background:#fbb;"
| 156 || September 30 || @ Angels || 1–4 || Detmers (7–6) || Otto (6–10) || Herget (9) || Angel Stadium || 32,939 || 66–90 || L3
|-

|- style="background:#fbb;"
| 157 || October 1 || @ Angels || 2–3 || Suárez (8–8) || Hernández (2–3) || Tepera (6) || Angel Stadium || 32,472 || 66–91 || L4
|- style="background:#fbb;"
| 158 || October 2 || @ Angels || 3–8 || Barría (3–3) || Miller (1–2) || — || Angel Stadium || 26,041 || 66–92 || L5
|- style="background:#fbb;"
| 159 || October 3 || Yankees || 1–3 || Severino (7–3) || Pérez (12–8) || Effross (4) || Globe Life Field || 35,906 || 66–93 || L6
|- style="background:#fbb;" 
| 160 || October 4  || Yankees || 4–5 || Chapman (4–4) || Burke (7–5) || Loáisiga (2) || Globe Life Field || 30,553 || 66–94 || L7
|- style="background:#bfb;" 
| 161 || October 4  || Yankees || 3–2 || Allard (1–2) || Cole (13–8) || Moore (4) || Globe Life Field || 38,832 || 67–94 || W1
|- style="background:#bfb;" 
| 162 || October 5 || Yankees || 4–2 || Otto (7–10) || Germán (2–5) || Moore (5) || Globe Life Field || 28,056 || 68–94 || W2
|-

Roster

Farm system

References

External links
 2022 Texas Rangers season at Baseball-Reference.com
 2022 Texas Rangers fullseason schedule and
 Statistics  at MLB.com

Texas Rangers seasons
Texas Rangers
Texas Rangers